Happy Talk is a horse ridden by American Bruce Davidson in the sport of eventing.

Happy Talk was bought by Furlong's brother from Clare Ryan, and was imported to the United States. He was originally intended to be shown in hunter classes at the Royal Dublin Horse Show, but he contracted ringworm and could not compete. Brendan Furlong bought the gelding as a four-year-old, and sent him to show jumper Michele Grubb, but Happy Talk's personality was not suited to the discipline.

Dr. Furlong's wife, Wendy, began bringing the horse along in eventing, before Davidson began riding him.

Happy Talk was difficult to train in dressage to the quality he would have to have to be competitive internationally, as he was very stiff in his topline. However, Davidson persisted, and competed the horse three times at the Rolex Kentucky Three Day: 1992, 1993, and 1995. Happy Talk won the event in 1993, and finished eighth and seventeenth respectively in 1992 and 1995.

Happy Talk is now retired at Dr. Furlong's farm in Pittstown, New Jersey.

External links
Happy Talk's pedigree
New Jersey Horse Enthusiast Web

Eventing horses
1983 animal births